Susan Sher is a lawyer and strategist in the United States who works for the University of Chicago and served as the chief of staff for the First Lady under Michelle Obama during the first 2 years of the Obama administration. She served as corporate counsel for Chicago earlier in her career. She headed the Obama Library Committee.

She was born in New Jersey. She is married to judge Neil Cohen. Oscar winning screenwriter Graham Moore is her son.

Kate Mulgrew portrays her in The First Lady. Sher succeeded Jackie Norris as First Lady Michelle Obama's chief of staff.

References

Year of birth missing (living people)
Living people
Obama administration personnel
American lawyers
People from New Jersey